Wenman Coke may refer to:

Wenman Coke (died 1776), MP for Norfolk
Wenman Coke (1828–1907), soldier and politician, grandson of the above